McCain Foods Limited is a Canadian multinational frozen food company established in 1957 in Florenceville, New Brunswick, Canada.

It is the world's largest manufacturer of frozen potato products. Its major competitors are Simplot and Lamb Weston.

History

McCain Foods was co-founded in 1957 by brothers Harrison McCain and Wallace McCain with the help of their two older brothers.

In their first year of production, the company hired 30 employees and grossed over $150,000 in sales. During the 1970s–1990s, the company expanded into additional prepared food markets including frozen pizza and vegetables.

As of 2017, the company is the world's largest manufacturer of frozen potato products, and has over 20,000 employees and 47 production facilities in six continents. The company generates more than C$8.5 billion in annual sales.

Based on 2014 sales, it is the 19th largest private company in Canada, according to The Globe and Mails Report on Business. Nancy McCain, of the McCain family, is married to former Canadian Finance Minister Bill Morneau. In 2020, McCain Foods won the Lausanne Index Prize – Best of Packaging.

UK operations
McCain Foods' UK subsidiary has a factory in Scarborough, North Yorkshire, and sponsored the former football stadium in the town until the football team was dissolved on 20 June 2007. There is also a plant at Whittlesey, Cambridgeshire and a cold store in Easton, Lincolnshire.

A legal case in which McCain Foods (GB) Ltd sued Eco-Tec (Europe) Ltd. was decided by the High Court in 2011. McCain had ordered a system intended to remove hydrogen sulphide from biogas produced in its waste water treatment plant, which would allow the gas to produce power and heat for the Whittlesey plant. The system proved to be "impossible to commission successfully" and so McCain sued for compensation. The court's ruling confirmed that Eco-Tec were in breach of their contract. Legally, the court took a broadly inclusive approach to the scope of the losses incurred by McCain and the damages due to them, declining to treat a number of items as "consequential losses" for which Eco-Tec sought protection under a contractual exclusion clause.

References

External links
 

Canadian companies established in 1957
Food and drink companies established in 1957
1957 establishments in New Brunswick
Food and drink companies of Canada
Multinational food companies
Multinational companies headquartered in Canada
Companies based in New Brunswick
Frozen food brands
Privately held companies of Canada
Canadian brands
Carleton County, New Brunswick
Family-owned companies of Canada